Belomys is a genus of squirrels that contains a single extant species, the hairy-footed flying squirrel (Belomys pearsonii).

Fossil species include the Pleistocene Belomys thamkaewi and the Late Pliocene Belomys parapearsoni, both from Southeast Asia.

References

Rodent genera
Flying squirrels
Mammal genera with one living species
Taxa named by Oldfield Thomas